Daniel or Dan Reese may refer to the following New Zealanders:

 Dan Reese (politician) (1841–1891), builder and MP
 Dan Reese (cricketer) (1879–1953), son of the MP
 Daniel Reese (cricketer) (1898–1954)